On 15 May 2007, a suicide bombing occurred at the Marharba hotel in Peshawar, Khyber Pakhtunkhwa, Pakistan. It killed 24 people and injured another 30.

References

2007 murders in Pakistan
2000s crimes in Khyber Pakhtunkhwa
2000s in Peshawar
21st-century mass murder in Pakistan
Attacks on buildings and structures in 2007
Attacks on buildings and structures in Peshawar
Attacks on hotels in Asia
Improvised explosive device bombings in 2007
Improvised explosive device bombings in Peshawar
Mass murder in 2007
Mass murder in Peshawar 
May 2007 crimes
May 2007 events in Pakistan
Terrorist incidents in Pakistan in 2007
Building bombings in Pakistan
Hotel bombings